Morale, also known as esprit de corps, is the capacity of a group's members to maintain belief in an institution or goal, particularly in the face of opposition or hardship. Morale is often referenced by authority figures as a generic value judgment of the willpower, obedience, and self-discipline of a group tasked with performing duties assigned by a superior. According to Alexander H. Leighton, "morale is the capacity of a group of people to pull together persistently and consistently in pursuit of a common purpose". Morale is important in the military, because it improves unit cohesion. With good morale, a force will be less likely to give up or surrender. Morale is usually assessed at a collective, rather than an individual level. In wartime, civilian morale is also important. Esprit de corps is considered to be an important part of a fighting unit.

Definition
Military history experts have not agreed on a precise definition of "morale". Clausewitz's comments on the subject have been described as "deliberately vague" by modern scholars. George Francis Robert Henderson, a widely read military author of the pre-World War I era, viewed morale as related to the instinct of self-preservation, the suppression of which he said was "the moral fear of turning back", in other words, that a willingness to fight was bolstered by a strong sense of duty. Henderson wrote:

Human nature must be the basis of every leader's calculations. To sustain the moral[e] of his own men; to break down the moral[e] of his enemy—these are the great objects which, if he be ambitious of success, he must always keep in view.

During the proceedings of the Southborough Committee inquiry concerning shellshock, testimony by Colonel J. F. C. Fuller defined morale as "the acquired quality which in highly-trained troops counterbalances the influence of the instinct of self-preservation." Of Henderson's "moral fear", the soldier's sense of duty, it is contrasted with the fear of death, and to control one's troops required of a commander more than authoritarian force, but other strategies to be deployed to that purpose.

Esprit de corps means spirit of the body, a French phrase.

Military

In military science, there are two meanings to morale. Primarily, it means unit cohesion: the cohesion of a unit, task force, or other military group. Morale is often highly dependent on soldier effectiveness, health, comfort, safety, and belief-in-purpose, and therefore an army with good supply lines, sound air cover, and a clear objective will typically possess, as a whole, better morale than one without. Historically, elite military units such as special operations forces have "high morale" due to their training and pride in their unit. When a unit's morale is said to be "depleted", it means it is close to "crack and surrender". It is well worth noting that generally speaking, most commanders do not look at the morale of specific individuals but rather the "fighting spirit" of squadrons, divisions, battalions, ships, etc.

In August 2012, an article entitled "Army morale declines in survey" states that "only a quarter of the [US] Army's officers and enlisted soldiers believe the nation's largest military branch is headed in the right direction." The "... most common reasons cited for the bleak outlook were "ineffective leaders at senior levels," a fear of losing the best and the brightest after a decade of war, and the perception, especially among senior enlisted soldiers, that "the Army is too soft" and lacks sufficient discipline."

Employee morale

Employee morale is proven to have a direct effect on productivity, it is one of the corner 
stones of business.

See also
 Military psychology
 Collective identity
 Demoralization (warfare)
 Information warfare
 Motivation
 Pre-work assembly
 Psychological warfare
 Rank theory of depression

References

External links
Matteo Ermacora: Civilian Morale, in: 1914-1918-online. International Encyclopedia of the First World War.

Psychological warfare
Psychological attitude
Motivation
Group processes